Chae Kyung-yee (born 2 October 1980) is a South Korean former professional tennis player.

Chae spent most her professional career competing on the ITF Circuit, reaching a best singles ranking by the WTA of 269 in the world. As a doubles player, she won eight titles on the ITF Circuit, including a $50,000 tournament in Gifu in 1999.

From 2000 to 2001, Chae played in eight Fed Cup ties for South Korea, for a 7–6 overall win–loss record.

ITF Circuit finals

Singles: 13 (5–8)

Doubles: 29 (8–21)

References

External links
 
 
 

1980 births
Living people
South Korean female tennis players
21st-century South Korean women